Judo in the 2004 Summer Paralympics was competed by blind or vision-impaired judokas. The only classification was by body weight. The contests were staged in the Ano Liossia Olympic Hall.

Participating countries

Medal table

The competition winner of the men's 60kg class, Sergio Arturo Perez (Cuba), received a warning and reprimand and lost his results and his gold medal after testing positive for the prohibited anti-inflammatory drug prednisolone.

Medal summary

Men

Women

See also
Judo at the 2004 Summer Olympics

References

 
2004 Summer Paralympics events
2004
Paralympics
Judo competitions in Greece